Suliasi is a Fijian masculine given name. Notable people with the name include:

Suliasi Kurulo (born 1958), Fijian Pentecostal minister and evangelist
Suliasi Taufalele (born 1988), New Zealand rugby union footballer
Suliasi Vunivalu (born 1995), Fijian rugby league footballer

Masculine given names